The Acul River is a river of Haiti.

See also
List of rivers of Haiti

References
GEOnet Names Server 

Rivers of Haiti